Andriy Volodymyrovych Ivanchuk (born June 16, 1973 in Ivano-Frankivsk, Ukraine) is a Ukrainian politician. People's Deputy of Ukraine. Member of the Popular Front party, Dovira parliamentary group. Chairman of the Verkhovna Rada Committee on Economic Policy.

Biography 
In 1991, after graduating from high school. Vasyl Stefanyk in the city of Kolomyia, enrolled in Chernivtsi State University. Yu. Fedkovych to the Faculty of Law. He graduated in 1996 with a degree in Law.

From December 12, 2012, to November 27, 2014 — People's Deputy of Ukraine of the 7th convocation from the party All-Ukrainian Association "Batkivshchyna", № 41 in the list. Deputy Chairman of the Faction, Chairman of the Verkhovna Rada Committee on Economic Policy.

He was a member of the Front for Change party, a member of the party's Council and Bureau, and from September 2009 to June 2010 he was acting chairman of the party. He also held the position of Deputy Chairman of the Council of the public organization, Chairman of the Executive Committee of the public organization "Front for Change". On June 15, 2013, after the unification of the Front for Change and the All-Ukrainian Association Batkivshchyna, he was elected one of the deputy leaders of Batkivshchyna.

References 

1973 births
Living people
Politicians from Ivano-Frankivsk
Chernivtsi University alumni
Seventh convocation members of the Verkhovna Rada
Eighth convocation members of the Verkhovna Rada
Ninth convocation members of the Verkhovna Rada
Front for Change (Ukraine) politicians
People's Front (Ukraine) politicians